Donwell Banister Hector (born 31 October 1988) is a Vincentian cricketer who has played for the Windward Islands in West Indian domestic cricket. He is a right-handed middle-order batsman.

Hector made his senior debut for the Windwards in October 2007, playing a limited-overs game against Guyana during the 2007–08 KFC Cup. His first-class debut came a few months later, in January 2008, against Barbados in the 2007–08 Carib Beer Cup. Later in 2008, Hector was selected for the Saint Vincent and Grenadines national team in two matches in the Stanford 20/20 tournament, which held full Twenty20 status. He had little success, scoring six runs against Sint Maarten and a golden duck against Trinidad and Tobago. During the 2008–09 Regional Four Day Competition, Hector scored 393 runs from eight matches, ranking him fourth for runs among his teammates (behind Rawl Lewis, Darren Sammy, and Andre Fletcher). His season included three half-centuries – 99 against Trinidad and Tobago, 79 not out against Guyana, and 67 against the Leeward Islands. However, his form tapered off in later seasons.

References

External links

1988 births
Living people
Saint Vincent and the Grenadines cricketers
Windward Islands cricketers